WTMQ-LD, virtual channel 41 (UHF digital channel 35), is a low-powered Antenna TV-affiliated television station licensed to Jacksonville, North Carolina, United States. The station is owned by Tutt Media Group.

History 
The station's construction permit was issued on September 28, 2010 under the calls of W41DU-D. It was changed to WTMJ-LD on September 28, 2012, then WJSW-LD October 2, 2012, and finally to the current WTMQ-LD on January 2, 2013.

Digital channels
The station's digital signal is multiplexed:

References

External links

Low-power television stations in the United States
Television stations in North Carolina
Television channels and stations established in 2010
2010 establishments in North Carolina